KUTT (99.5 FM) is a radio station broadcasting a Country music format. Licensed to Fairbury, Nebraska, United States, the station serves the Lincoln area. The station is currently owned by Flood Communications of Beatrice, LLC.

References

External links
 

Country radio stations in the United States
UTT